Pier Paolo Polcari (Paolo Polcari or Polcari b. in 1969) is an Italian musician. He is a keyboard player, composer and producer.

Career

Almamegretta 
During his time in Almamegretta between 1990 and 1999 the band released five albums primarily for BMG Records), touring Italy and Europe several times for approximately 600 gigs. Studio collaborations include works with Massive Attack, Adrian Sherwood, Bill Laswell, Transglobal Underground and Zion Train. At the end of 1999, he moved to London, where he spent two years acquiring a master's degree in film and video composition with Maestro Amit Sen. He returned to work with Almamegretta and produced two albums (Vulgus in 2006 and Dubfellas Vol.2 in 2010).

Soundtracks 
He composed several soundtracks for cinema, including "Pianese Nunzio" (Venice Film Festival, 1996), "Luna Rossa" (Venice Film Festival 2001), "Passo a Due" in 2006, Nauta (2011) and other theatre and documentary works. In addition, he produces and remixes music for different artists from labels such as Universal, BMG, Sony, and Nun. In 2003, he co-wrote and produced Wop, the first Raiz (Almamegretta singer) solo album.

Producer 
In London, he works as a producer for dance labels Shoreline, Mikeli Music and Betchwood; and collaborates in studio and live performances with many artists and companies

Solo project 
"Home P-Fi" is his first solo project available worldwide on iTunes.
In 2006, he started to work as a producer for the violin virtuoso Lino Cannavacciuolo ("Nenia", "Segesta", "Il Decamerone", "Crimini") and for the Neapolitan Peppe Barra. He is producing new material for Alma. He is also promoting his new solo album INTRATERRAE, released on 27 February by Marocco Music/Audioglobe.

Side projects
Funsui published by labels Elastica and Iboga
Meditronica with Ashtech published by Rare Noise Records.

References

External links
 Official website
 

1969 births
Dub musicians
Italian keyboardists
Italian film score composers
Italian male film score composers
Living people
Musicians from Naples